Margaret Ellen Marks (5 January 1918 – 20 August 2014) was a New Zealand cricketer who played as an all-rounder. She appeared in two Test matches for New Zealand between 1935 and 1948. She played domestic cricket for Canterbury.

References

External links
 
 
 New Zealand Cricket Museum: In Memory of Margaret

1918 births
2014 deaths
Cricketers from Christchurch
New Zealand women cricketers
New Zealand women Test cricketers
Canterbury Magicians cricketers